Maumee Swamp is located north of and drains into Weaver Lake. It is located northwest of Warren, New York.

References

Wetlands of New York (state)